Rankin County may refer to:

 Rankin County, Mississippi, United States
 Rankin County, New South Wales, Australia